Haliophyle flavistigma is a moth of the family Noctuidae. It was first described by William Warren in 1912. It is endemic to the Hawaiian island of Maui.

External links

Hadeninae
Endemic moths of Hawaii